The women's pole vault event at the 2016 African Championships in Athletics was held on 23 June in Kings Park Stadium.

Results

References

2016 African Championships in Athletics
Pole vault at the African Championships in Athletics
2016 in women's athletics